Søren Pedersen (born 2 November 1978) is a Danish former professional footballer who played as a right-back and spent most of his career at the Danish team Randers FC. He was once the captain of the team, and was a highly valued member of the squad.

External links
Career statistics at Danmarks Radio

1978 births
Living people
Danish men's footballers
Association football fullbacks
Aarhus Gymnastikforening players
Randers FC players
Danish Superliga players